A Buccellato  is a Sicilian circular cake. Buccellato contains figs and nuts. It is traditionally associated with Christmas in Sicily.

It is not to be confused with the distinct, but similar traditional Lucchese cake of the same name, the buccellato (di Lucca), although both are ring-shaped sweet breads that contain candied fruit peels.

See also
Cuccidati

References

Italian cakes
Cuisine of Sicily
Christmas cakes
Fig dishes
Nut dishes